"Lost for Words" is the first single released from Irish singer-songwriter Ronan Keating's third studio album, Turn It On (2003). The song was written by Keating, Wayne Hector, and David Frank and was released on 10 November 2003. "Lost for Words" peaked at number nine on the UK Singles Chart.

Track listings
UK CD1
 "Lost for Words" – 3:41
 "I Couldn't Love You More" – 4:07
 "Lost for Words" (Robbie Rivera vocal mix) – 6:05
 "Lost for Words" (video) – 3:45

UK CD2
 "Lost for Words" – 3:41
 "It Was You" – 2:44
 "Lost For Words" (acoustic version) – 3:35

References

2003 singles
Ronan Keating songs
Songs written by Ronan Keating
Songs written by Wayne Hector